Elections to the Legislative Assembly of the Indian state of Vindhya Pradesh were held on March 26, 1952. 252 candidates contested the 48 constituencies in the Assembly. There were 12 two-member constituencies, and 36 single-member constituencies. The Indian National Congress won a majority of seats and Sambhu Nath Shukla became the new Chief Minister.

Results

|- style="background-color:#E9E9E9; text-align:center;"
!colspan=8|
|-
! class="unsortable" |
! Political party !! Seats  Contested !! Won !! % of  Seats !! Votes !! Vote %
|- style="background: #90EE90;"
| 
! scope="row" style="text-align:left;" | Indian National Congress
| 56 || 40 || 66.67 || 2,70,013 || 39.60
|-
| 
! scope="row"  style="text-align:left;" |Kisan Mazdoor Praja Party
| 49 || 3 || 5.00 || 1,10,465 || 16.2
|-
| 
! scope="row"  style="text-align:left;" |Socialist Party
| 46 || 11 || 18.33 || 1,28,187 || 18.80
|-
| 
! scope="row"  style="text-align:left;" |Bharatiya Jana Sangh
| 33 || 2 || 3.33 || 67,330 || 9.88
|-
| 
! scope="row"  style="text-align:left;" |Akhil Bharatiya Ram Rajya Parishad
| 17 || 2 || 3.33 || 30,817 || 4.52
|-
| 
! scope="row"  style="text-align:left;" |Independent politician
| 42 || 2 || 3.33 || 62,102 || 9.11
|- class="unsortable" style="background-color:#E9E9E9"
! colspan = 2| Total Seats
! 60 !! style="text-align:center;" |Voters !! 24,03,588 !! style="text-align:center;" |Turnout !! 6,81,799 (28.37%)
|}

Elected Members

State Reorganization and Merger
On 1 November 1956, Vindhya Pradesh was merged into Madhya Pradesh under States Reorganisation Act, 1956.

See also

 Vindhya Pradesh
 1951–52 elections in India
1952 Bhopal Legislative Assembly election
1952 Madhya Bharat Legislative Assembly election
 1952 Madhya Pradesh Legislative Assembly election
 1957 Madhya Pradesh Legislative Assembly election

References

State Assembly elections in Madhya Pradesh
1950s in Madhya Pradesh
Vindhya Pradesh
March 1952 events in Asia